Phorbol-12-myristate-13-acetate-induced protein 1 is a protein that in humans is encoded by the PMAIP1 gene, and is also known as Noxa.

Noxa (Latin for damage) is a pro-apoptotic member of the Bcl-2 protein family. Bcl-2 family members can form hetero- or homodimers, and they act as anti- or pro-apoptotic regulators that are involved in a wide variety of cellular activities. The expression of Noxa is regulated by the tumor suppressor p53, and Noxa has been shown to be involved in p53-mediated apoptosis.

Interactions 
Noxa has been shown to interact with:
 BCL2-like 1, 
 Bcl-2, and
 MCL1.

See also 
 Apoptosis
 Apoptosome
 Bcl-2
 Bcl-2-associated X protein (BAX)
 BH3 interacting domain death agonist (BID)
 Caspases
 Cytochrome c
 Mitochondrion
 p53 upregulated modulator of apoptosis (PUMA)
 12-O-Tetradecanoylphorbol-13-acetate (Phorbol-12-myristate-13-acetate)

References

Further reading

External links 
 

Programmed cell death
Proteins
Apoptosis